Australian High Commission may refer to:
High Commission of Australia, London
List of Australian High Commissioners to Canada
List of Australian High Commissioners to New Zealand
List of Australian High Commissioners to the United Kingdom